Daniel Martin may refer to:

Footballers
Dan Martin (footballer, born 1986), English-Welsh footballer
Dan Martin (footballer, born 2002), English footballer
Dani Martín (footballer, born 1997), Spanish footballer
Dani (footballer, born 1981), Spanish footballer
Dani Martín (footballer, born 1998), Spanish footballer

Other people
Dan Martin (actor) (born 1951), American actor
Dan Martin (drama educator) (born 1953), American academic
Dan Martin (cyclist) (born 1986), Irish road bicycle racer
Dan Martin (cartoonist), American cartoonist
Dani Martín (field hockey), Spanish field hockey coach
Dani Martín (singer) (born 1977), Spanish musician and actor
Daniel Martín (actor) (1935–2009), Spanish actor
Daniel Martin (politician) (c. 1780–1831), American politician, governor of the state of Maryland
Daniel S. Martin (fl. 1902–1906), American college football coach
Daniel P. Martin, United States Navy admiral
Daniel Martin (swimmer), Romanian swimmer

Books
Daniel Martin (novel), 1977 novel by John Fowles

See also

Daniel Marthin (born 2001), Indonesian badminton player